The Garage at 219 Main Street in Farmington, Maine, was once a Free Will Baptist Meetinghouse.  Built in 1835, it is one of a relatively small number of 19th-century brick meeting houses, and its history exhibits the creative reuse of structures in rural Maine.  It was listed on the National Register of Historic Places in 1973.

Description
The church is a rectangular brick structure, set well back from Main Street, with a gable roof whose end faces the street.  It exhibits modest Federal styling, with a pair of entry doors on the front facade, each with narrow sidelight windows and topped by a decorative fan.  Above each door is a single sash window, with 12 over 8 lights.  The gable pediment also has a decorative fan.  There is a large doorway in the center of the southern facade, presently used as a garage door.  The interior, although significantly altered from its original religious setting, includes the inscription "Glory to God in the Highest" on its plaster walls.

History
The Free Will Baptist congregation was established in Farmington in 1793, and first met in people's homes and barns.  This meetinghouse was built in 1835 at a cost of $1,250, and was the first of the denomination north and east of Gorham.  In the early 20th century the building was converted for use as a cheese factory, at which time the side garage entrance was added.  Later 20th century uses included a medical facility, a stable, and as a fur storage building, before its present use as residential garage.

See also
National Register of Historic Places listings in Franklin County, Maine

References

Baptist churches in Maine
Churches on the National Register of Historic Places in Maine
Federal architecture in Maine
Churches completed in 1835
19th-century Baptist churches in the United States
Farmington, Maine
National Register of Historic Places in Franklin County, Maine
Historic district contributing properties in Maine